Sven Olof Fredrik Söderström (born 30 January 1973) is a Swedish retired footballer who played as a midfielder.

Club career
Born in Ludvika, Söderström started his professional career with lowly IK Brage. In January 1997 he moved to Vitória de Guimarães in Portugal, where his stellar performances attracted the attention of fellow Primeira Liga club FC Porto.

Söderström played 24 matches in his first season, but went on to serve consecutive loans for the remainder of his contract, mainly in that nation, as the northerners achieved consecutive European competition accolades. In January 2005, at 32 and having appeared in more than 200 overall games in Portugal, he left for Spain where he represented Córdoba CF and UD Lanzarote, in the second and third levels respectively. He returned to his country in 2008 after 11 years, signing with Hammarby IF.

Söderström announced his retirement from football on 20 February 2011 at the age of nearly 38, after being released by Hammarby on a free transfer.

International career
Söderström played five games for the Swedish national team over a period of four years, but never appeared in any major international tournament. He earned his first cap on 2 June 1998, starting and featuring 62 minutes in a 1–0 friendly win against Italy in Gothenburg.

References

External links

1973 births
Living people
Swedish footballers
Association football midfielders
Allsvenskan players
IK Brage players
Hammarby Fotboll players
Primeira Liga players
Liga Portugal 2 players
Vitória S.C. players
FC Porto players
S.C. Braga players
C.F. Estrela da Amadora players
Belgian Pro League players
Standard Liège players
Segunda División players
Segunda División B players
Córdoba CF players
Sweden international footballers
Swedish expatriate footballers
Expatriate footballers in Portugal
Expatriate footballers in Belgium
Expatriate footballers in Spain
Swedish expatriate sportspeople in Portugal
Swedish expatriate sportspeople in Spain